The FR F2 has been the standard sniper rifle of the French military since 1986. It is designed for shooting at point targets at distances up to 800 metres.

History
In August 2018, a tender was released by the French government for a replacement to the FR F2.

Design 
The FR-F2 is an upgrade from the earlier FR F1 sniper rifle. The rifle barrel is thermally shielded along a considerable part of the barrel by a polymer shroud. The barrel is free floated and is equipped with a flash hider. It uses a different bipod-stock configuration from its predecessor, which is built just ahead of the receiver. GIAT studies lead to a new three groove conical barrel. Tapering the barrel from the throat area up to the first 100 mm of the barrel and at the muzzle end reduced barrel wear caused by propellant gasses passing the projectile in the bore.

The rifle's manual safety is located at the rear of the trigger.

It uses 7.62×51mm NATO ammunition and is equipped with a telescopic sight. French army standard issue is either an APX L806, with a bullet drop compensation calibrated for 7.62×51mm NATO ammunition from 100 to 800 m in 100 m increments, or SCROME J8 (Army) or Nightforce NXS (Air force) or Schmidt & Bender 6×42 mil-dot (Navy). Backup sights on top of the barrel shroud are standard on each F2 rifle.

The rifle is also issued as part of the FÉLIN infantry combat system outfitted with a SAGEM Sword Sniper 3-in-1 optic, which serves as a telescopic sight, thermal weapon sight, and laser rangefinder. The FR F2 utilizes the same basic bolt design as the older MAS-36 infantry rifle. The MAS-36 bolt action was however extensively modified and strengthened to reduce accuracy-inhibiting flex in the FR F1 and FR F2.

Users

: French military.
 : replaced by the Sako TRG
: Lithuanian Armed Forces.

Gallery

See also

PGM Hécate II, the heavy, long-range modern French sniper rifle.

References

External links
 SCROME telescopic sights 
 Forgotten Weapons: History of the FR-F1 and FR-F2 Sniper Rifles: Henri Canaple Interview

7.62×51mm NATO rifles
Bolt-action rifles of France
Nexter Systems
Sniper rifles of France
Military equipment introduced in the 1980s